The Merritt School, also known as the Old Merritt School, is a Rosenwald School that was built around 1922.  It was listed on the National Register of Historic Places in 1998.

It is a one-story frame building, built to standard Design No. 20 and No. 20-A for a two-teacher Rosenwald school.  It was modified in c.1935 and c.1946.

References

Rosenwald schools in Alabama
National Register of Historic Places in Bullock County, Alabama
School buildings completed in 1922
1922 establishments in Alabama